The Korea City Air Terminal in Gangnam district, Seoul, is one of South Korea's Airport terminals. It is part of the COEX complex.

The Korea City Air Tower is a public transportation facility in which travellers on certain flights can check in their luggage at the terminal before leaving for the airport as well as going through immigration for expedited entry once at the airport. As of December, 2015, the Korea City Air Terminal supports flights for Korean Air, Asiana Airlines, Qatar Airways, Singapore Airlines, Jeju Air, Thai Airways, Air Canada, Philippine Airlines, MIAT Mongolian Airlines, China Eastern Airlines, Shanghai Airlines, China Southern Airlines, Japan Airlines, KLM Royal Dutch Airlines, Delta Air Lines and United Airlines.

External links
 

Buildings and structures in Gangnam District
Airport terminals
Bus transport in South Korea
World Trade Center Seoul